Joseph David Jones (1827 – 17 September 1870) was a Welsh composer and schoolmaster, commonly known as J. D. Jones.  He was the father of the politician and industrialist Sir Henry Haydn Jones and the renowned Congregationalist minister, John Daniel Jones (1865-1942).

Jones was head of Rhos Street School, and later founded the Clwyd Bank Academy, a private grammar school, at Ruthin.  His compositions included songs and hymn tunes, the best-known of which is 'Capel y Ddôl'.

Sources
Notes

Bibliography
Archives Network Wales
DNB reference: R. M. J. Jones, ‘Jones, Joseph David (1827–1870)’, rev. David J. Golby, first published Sept 2004

1827 births
1870 deaths
Welsh composers
Welsh male composers
19th-century British composers
19th-century British male musicians